Stephen Knight is a Labour politician in the United Kingdom who has previously been a member of the London Assembly for the Liberal Democrats.

Political career
Knight was a councillor in Richmond upon Thames and a past leader of the Liberal Democrat group there. From 2006 to 2010, he served as Deputy Leader with responsibility for finance.  He was largely responsible for the rebuilding of Teddington School under the Building Schools for the Future programme.

He was elected as a London-wide member of the London Assembly in 2012, but did not stand in 2016 after being demoted by party members from second place to fifth place on the Liberal Democrat candidate list.

He defected to the Labour Party in January 2018 and was not re-elected on 3 May 2018.

Personal life
His partner, Jennifer Churchill, was a Labour councillor in Richmond upon Thames after defecting from the Liberal Democrats in 2015. She failed to be re-elected in May 2018 when she stood in West Twickenham, finishing behind Liberal Democrat and Conservative candidates.

References

Living people
Year of birth missing (living people)
Councillors in the London Borough of Richmond upon Thames
Labour Party (UK) councillors
Liberal Democrat Members of the London Assembly
Liberal Democrats (UK) councillors